The Palace of the Governors is an adobe structure built in the Territorial Style of Pueblo architecture on Palace Avenue in Santa Fe, New Mexico. Located within the Santa Fe Historic District along the Santa Fe Plaza between Lincoln and Washington avenues, it has served as the seat of government for New Mexico for centuries, having been established as the capitol building of Nuevo México in 1610.

History
In 1610, Pedro de Peralta, the newly appointed governor of Santa Fe de Nuevo México covering most of the modern American Southwest, began construction on the Palace of the Governors, though some recent historical research has suggested that construction began midway through his term in 1618. In the following years, the Palace changed hands as the territory of New Mexico did, seeing the Pueblo Revolt of 1680, the Spanish return from 1693 to 1694, Mexican independence in 1821, American territorial status in 1848, and US statehood in 1912.

The Palace originally served as the seat of government of the Spanish colony of Nuevo Mexico, which at one time comprised the present-day states of Texas, Arizona, Utah, Colorado, Nevada, and New Mexico.  After the Mexican War of Independence, the Mexican province of Santa Fe de Nuevo México was administered from the Palace of the Governors. When New Mexico was annexed as a U.S. territory, the Palace became New Mexico's first territorial capitol.

Lew Wallace wrote the final parts of his book Ben-Hur: A Tale of the Christ in this building while serving as territorial governor in the late 1870s.  He remembered later in life that it was at night, during a severe thunderstorm in the spring of 1879, after returning from a tense meeting with Billy the Kid in Lincoln County, when he wrote the climactic Crucifixion scenes of the novel. Wallace worked by the light of a shaded lamp in the shuttered governor's study, fearing a bullet from outside over the tensions surrounding the Lincoln County War.

In 1909 anthropologist Dr. Edgar Lee Hewett invited the young archeologist Jesse L. Nusbaum to oversee the restoration of the Palace of the Governors that had fallen into disrepair. For this assignment, which was completed in the Fall of 1913, Jesse L. Nusbaum was hired as the first employee of the Dr. Edgar Lee Hewett led School of American Archaeology, later the School of American Research, and Museum of New Mexico in Santa Fe, New Mexico. In his journal, Nusbaum stressed the importance of melding the Palace architecture with the environment, noting that "the Palace was begun with an adaptation to climate and atmosphere and had been fitted into the color of earth and sky.", a view he later applied again as Superintendent of Mesa Verde National Park.

Between 1909, when the New Mexico territorial legislature established the Museum of New Mexico, and Summer 2009 the Palace of the Governors served as the site of the state history museum.

In 2009 the New Mexico History Museum was opened adjacent to the Palace, which is now one of eight museums overseen by the New Mexico Department of Cultural Affairs.

It was declared a National Historic Landmark in 1960.

The United States Postal Service issued a turquoise -cent stamp on June 17, 1960, featuring an image of the Palace. According to Steven J. Rod, "This was in coincidence with the opening day of Santa Fe's 350th anniversary celebration. The Palace is shown on the stamp from a front angle, a design which was taken from a photograph by Tyler Dingee of Santa Fe. The Governor's Palace stamp was the eighth 'national shrine' honored by this series."

See also

Oldest buildings in the United States
National Register of Historic Places listings in Santa Fe County, New Mexico
List of National Historic Landmarks in New Mexico

References

External links 

Palace of the Governors  – part of the NM History Museum campus
 
 Palace of the Governors Photo Archives

Houses completed in 1610
Museums in Santa Fe, New Mexico
History museums in New Mexico
National Historic Landmarks in New Mexico
Houses on the National Register of Historic Places in New Mexico
Former governors' mansions in the United States
New Mexico
Palaces in the United States
Spanish-American culture in Santa Fe, New Mexico
Spanish Colonial architecture in New Mexico
Colonial Mexico
Adobe buildings and structures in New Mexico
National Society of the Colonial Dames of America
National Register of Historic Places in Santa Fe, New Mexico
1610 establishments in the Spanish Empire
Historic district contributing properties in New Mexico
Governor of New Mexico